John McMillan (July 24, 1824 – October 31, 1901) was an Ontario farmer and political figure. He represented Huron South in the House of Commons of Canada as a Liberal member in 1883 and from 1887 to 1900.

He was born in Kirkconnel, Dumfriesshire, Scotland in 1824 and came to Huron County in Canada West with his brother in 1843. He purchased land from the Canada Company and began farming on it, raising and selling beef cattle and Clydesdale horses. In 1880, he was appointed to the Ontario agricultural commission, which prepared a report that described the state of agriculture in the province.

He served on the advisory board of the Ontario Agricultural College and lectured as part of the Farmers' Institutes program initiated by the college. McMillan served as reeve for Hullett Township from 1877 to 1882 and from 1884 to 1887.

Death
McMillan died on his farm in Hullett Township in 1901, aged 77.

References
 
 

1824 births
1901 deaths
Liberal Party of Canada MPs
Members of the House of Commons of Canada from Ontario
People from Dumfries and Galloway
Scottish emigrants to pre-Confederation Ontario
Immigrants to the Province of Canada